Igor Oskar Grobelny (born 8 June 1993) is a Belgian–Polish professional volleyball player, a former member of the Belgium national team. At the professional club level, he plays for Projekt Warsaw.

He has a younger sister, Kaja. Their father, Dariusz was a volleyball player, and a member of the Poland national team.

References

External links
 
 Player profile at PlusLiga.pl 
 Player profile at Volleybox.net

1993 births
Living people
People from Radom
Sportspeople from Masovian Voivodeship
Polish emigrants to Belgium
Belgian men's volleyball players
Polish men's volleyball players
Belgian expatriate sportspeople in Poland
Expatriate volleyball players in Poland
Belgian expatriate sportspeople in Germany
Expatriate volleyball players in Germany
Czarni Radom players
Cuprum Lubin players
Projekt Warsaw players
Outside hitters